The Torrent River is a river of the Tasman Region of New Zealand's South Island. It flows east to reach Torrent Bay on the Tasman Bay / Te Tai-o-Aorere coast of the Abel Tasman National Park. The Abel Tasman Track crosses the river close to its mouth.

See also
List of rivers of New Zealand

References

Rivers of the Tasman District
Rivers of New Zealand